Ethylmorphine (also known as codethyline, dionine, and ethyl morphine) is an opioid analgesic and antitussive.

Side effects
Adverse effects are similar to other opioids and include drowsiness, constipation, vertigo, nausea, vomiting, and respiratory depression. Contraindications include asthma, respiratory insufficiency, and age under 8. Ethylmorphine may affect the user's ability to drive and operate heavy machinery, and may cause chemical dependence or addiction at high doses.

Society and culture
Ethylmorphine was first marketed in France in 1953 by Houde, and in Norway and Spain in 1960. It is not available in the United States, where it is a Schedule II controlled substance.

See also 

 Codeine
 Dihydrocodeine
 Morphine
 Pholcodine

References 

Secondary alcohols
Antitussives
4,5-Epoxymorphinans
Semisynthetic opioids
Phenol ethers
Mu-opioid receptor agonists
Ophthalmology drugs